The following is an incomplete list of settlements nicknamed Venice of the North. The term Venice of the North refers to various cities in Northern Europe that contain canals, comparing them to Venice, Italy, which is renowned for its canals (see Grand Canal). Some of these nicknames (e.g. in the case of Amsterdam) date back centuries, while others like Birmingham are very recently given and invented as self-promotion by the cities' own residents or representatives.

List

See also
 List of places called Venice of the East
 Little Paris
 Little Venice
 Little Berlin
 Monasterevin
 Paris of the East
 Paris of the West
 Venezuela, country whose name means "Little Venice"

References 

Lists of cities by nickname
Venice